Mauro Luiz Iecker Vieira  (born 15 February 1951) is a Brazilian diplomat serving as Minister of Foreign Affairs of Brazil since 1 January 2023 under President Luiz Inácio Lula da Silva. Vieira occupied the same office between 2015 and 2016 during President Dilma Rousseff's second term.

Biography
Mauro Luiz Iecker Vieira was born in Rio de Janeiro. He has a bachelor's degree in Law from the Fluminense Federal University (UFF), and graduated from the Brazilian diplomatic academy, the Rio Branco Institute, in 1974.

Career
As a career diplomat he served at the Brazilian embassy in Washington, D.C., from 1978 to 1982 and at the Brazilian Mission to the Latin American Integration Association (ALADI) in Montevideo from 1982 to 1985. After a period back in Brasília, he then served at the Brazilian embassy in Mexico City (1990-1992) and at the Embassy in Paris (1995-1999).

He was nominated Brazil's ambassador to Argentina in Buenos Aires from 2004 to 2010 and since then was the Brazilian Ambassador to the United States up until President Dilma Rousseff announced his nomination as Foreign Minister on 31 December 2014.

He has worked at other federal agencies including being Assistant Secretary General at the Ministry of Science and Technology and National Administration Secretary in the Ministry of Social Security and Assistance.

Honours
:
 Grand Officer of the Order of Military Merit (O.M.M.) (2005)
:
 Member of the Order of Roraima (O.R.) (2016)

References

External links

1951 births
Ambassadors of Brazil to Argentina
Ambassadors of Brazil to the United States
Brazilian diplomats
Federal University of Rio de Janeiro alumni
Foreign ministers of Brazil
Living people
Ambassadors of Brazil to Croatia
Permanent Representatives of Brazil to the United Nations